The 1972 New York City Marathon was the 3rd edition of the New York City Marathon and took place in New York City on 1 October.

A total of 187 marathon runners finished the race, including 185 men and two women.

Results

Men

Women

References

External links

New York City Marathon, 1972
New York City
Marathon
New York City Marathon